The 2011 FLB Playoffs is the final phase of the 2010–11 Lebanese Basketball League. It started on April 17, 2011 and ended on May 8, 2011.

Bracket

Semifinals 

The semifinals are best-of-5 series.

Riyadi  vs. Sagesse

Champville  vs. Mouttahed

Finals 
The finals are best-of-5 series.

Riyadi vs Champville

References 

Playoff